Brendon George Kofi Nana Osei Mainoo Daniels (born 24 September 1993) is an English footballer who plays as a winger for  club A.F.C. Telford United.

He turned professional at Crewe Alexandra in May 2011, but was released after two years with the club and dropped out of the English Football League. He had brief stays with Chester and Gateshead, before signing with Tamworth in August 2014. He joined Harrogate Town in June 2015 and went on to be named as both the club's Player of the Year and in the National League North Team of the Year for the 2015–16 season. He signed with AFC Fylde in May 2016, who had beaten Harrogate in the play-offs, and helped his new club to win promotion as champions of the National League North for the 2016–17 campaign. He remained in the National League North however, joining Alfreton Town in August 2017, before making a return to the Football League after being signed to Port Vale in May 2018. He started the 2018–19 season on loan at Altrincham and went on to sign with A.F.C. Telford United in January 2019 following a successful loan spell. He won the club's  Player of the Year award for the 2019–20 season.

Career

Crewe Alexandra
Born in Stoke-on-Trent, Daniels started his career with Crewe Alexandra at the age of nine, before signing a scholarship in 2010. Back with his local school, Haywood High, he formed a strike partnership with Crewe teammate Ryan Colclough and helped Haywood to reach the Sentinel Schools' Shield final at Vale Park in 2010, where they were beaten 3–1 by Alleyne's. In May 2011, he signed his first professional contract after being handed a two-year deal by manager Dario Gradi. He made his professional debut on 11 August 2012, replacing A-Jay Leitch-Smith as a 78th-minute substitute in a 5–0 win over Hartlepool United at the Alexandra Stadium in the League Cup. He made a total of ten appearances for the "Railwaymen" in the first half of the 2012–13 season, though started only two games in League One. On 21 February 2013, he joined Conference North side Chester on a one-month loan. Two days later he scored just 12 minutes into his debut for Neil Young's "Blues", in a 2–0 win over Vauxhall Motors at the Deva Stadium. He played just one further game before returning to Crewe, who released him at the end of his contract in May 2013. Manager Steve Davis had told him he did not feature in his plans due to his lack of experience.

Non-league
Daniels had a trial with Championship side Blackburn Rovers in October 2013 and scored a brace in a Lancashire Senior Cup win over Rochdale. In January 2014, he went on trial at Gateshead and scored a hat trick for a Gateshead XI in a Durham Challenge Cup game against Darlington 1883 at the Gateshead International Stadium. Despite this feat "Heed" manager Gary Mills opted not to offer him a contract. On 25 February 2014, Daniels signed for Chester, now of the Conference Premier and managed by Steve Burr, on non-contract terms. He went on to make three league appearances for the "Seals", before he was released at the end of the 2013–14 season.

On 2 August 2014, Brendon joined Tamworth after impressing manager Dale Belford on a trial basis. Speaking in January 2015, after the "Lambs" had won their ninth consecutive Conference North game, Daniels stated that he was happy at The Lamb Ground despite being linked to a number of other clubs. He scored seven goals in 31 appearances across the 2014–15 season as Andy Morrell's side posted a seventh-place finish, missing out on the play-offs by a single point.

On 8 June 2015, he signed with Harrogate Town. He was named as Harrogate's Player of the Year after scoring 23 goals in 43 appearances during the 2015–16 season. This tally included a strike against Grimsby Town in the FA Cup. He was also named on the National League North Team of the Year. His goals helped Simon Weaver's Town to secure a play-off place, before they were eliminated at the semi-final stage by AFC Fylde. His form also attracted the attention of the England C selectors, and he made his debut for the "Three Lions" in a 2–0 victory over Ukraine C in March.

On 25 May 2016, Daniels signed a three-year contract at beaten National League North play-off finalists AFC Fylde. Manager Dave Challinor had previously had an approach for Daniels rejected by Harrogate early in the 2015–16 season. Fylde made a switch to full-time training over the summer in what chairman David Haythornthwaite described as "the biggest few months in the history of this club". Daniels scored seven goals in 32 appearances during the 2016–17 season, helping the "Coasters" to achieve their ambition by winning promotion as champions of the National League North.

On 24 August 2017, Daniels joined Alfreton Town on a one-year deal. The "Reds" could only manage a 17th-place finish at the end of the 2017–18 season, though Daniels managed to claim 13 goals from 36 National League North games, finding an upturn in form under new manager Chris Moyses after initially struggling for form at North Street under John McDermott.

Port Vale
On 17 May 2018, Daniels signed a six-month contract with League Two side Port Vale; manager Neil Aspin said that "he is a local lad who is desperate to prove himself at this level". Daniels himself said that "this is perfect, I couldn't wish to be at a better club. It is my local club... in the last four years I have worked hard and learned my craft and believe I can deliver in League Two". However manager Neil Aspin said that Daniels reported for pre-season training unfit, and so before the 2018–19 season began Aspin sent Daniels out on loan to newly promoted National League North side Altrincham in order to gain match fitness. He stayed at Moss Lane for four weeks and made seven appearances for the "Robins". Upon his return to Vale Park he made his first-team debut away in a 2–1 victory at Walsall, coming on as a 65th-minute substitute for Antony Kay in the EFL Trophy group stage game.

A.F.C. Telford United
On 27 November 2018, he returned to the National League North on loan at A.F.C. Telford United; "Bucks" manager Gavin Cowan said that "he has phenomenal ability and has maybe fallen out of love with the game a little bit, and I want to mentor him". On 26 December, he scored a 30-yard free-kick in a 3–1 win over Nuneaton Borough at the New Bucks Head. The loan was made into a permanent deal six days later. Cowan stated that he and Daniels had "a little bit of a love-love, love-hate relationship. But it's a good one." He went on to finish the 2018–19 season with five goals in 21 games for Telford. He scored seven goals in 29 games during the 2019–20 campaign – which came to a premature conclusion due to the COVID-19 pandemic in England – and was given the club's away travel and club player of the year awards, with Cowan stating that "to say he's matured as a person over his time with us is an understatement". He struggled with a hamstring problem and featured five times in the 2020–21 season, which was curtailed early due to the ongoing pandemic.

Daniels signed a new contract in June 2021. However recurrent hamstring problems caused him to miss much of the first half of the 2021–22 season and manager Paul Carden was careful not to bring him back too soon. After scoring six goals in nine games since returning to the squad he said he was only 70% fit and would continue to improve. He would lead the club's successful fight against relegation and entered talks for a new contract in the summer.

Style of play
Daniels can play on the left-wing or as an attacking midfielder. He is a good free-kick taker and has been praised for his crossing ability.

Career statistics

Honours
Individual
Harrogate Town Player of the Year: 2015–16
National League North Team of the Year: 2015–16
A.F.C. Telford United Player of the Year: 2019–20

AFC Fylde
National League North: 2016–17

References

1993 births
Living people
Footballers from Stoke-on-Trent
Black British sportsmen
English footballers
Association football wingers
Crewe Alexandra F.C. players
Chester F.C. players
Tamworth F.C. players
Harrogate Town A.F.C. players
AFC Fylde players
Alfreton Town F.C. players
Port Vale F.C. players
Altrincham F.C. players
AFC Telford United players
English Football League players
National League (English football) players